Torodd Hilding Hauer (8 July 1922 – 4 December 2010) was a Norwegian speed skater. He competed in the 1948 Winter Olympics and finished sixth in the 500 m event.

Hauer was a sprinter and never placed within the podium at the Norwegian all-round championships. He competed between 1945 and 1962, and continued to improve his personal best times until late thirties. After retiring from skating he owned a successful construction firm in Lillehammer.

References

External links

 Speed skating 1948 

1922 births
2010 deaths
Norwegian male speed skaters
Olympic speed skaters of Norway
Speed skaters at the 1948 Winter Olympics
People from Gran, Norway
Sportspeople from Innlandet